Kandalama is a village in Sri Lanka. It is located within Central Province. Kandalama is flagged by two UNESCO world heritage sites - the 1st Century BC Dambulla cave temple and the 5th Century AD Sigiriya rock fortress.

Kandalama is also home for Kaludiya Pokuna Archeological Forest and one of Sri Lanka's first five star hotels, Heritance Kandalama from where you can enjoy the beauty of UNESCO world heritages sites: the 2000 years old cave temple at Dambulla and the Sigiriya Rock Fortress.

The ancient irrigation tank built by King Vasabha, 1700 years ago is situated at Kandalama. Nestling at the foot of Ereulagala 696m (above M.S.L) and Dikkandahena 618m (above M.S.L), the village is situated at the northern end of the Matale hills, and the beginning of the dry plains. The village lies on the border of the intermediate and dry zones.

See also
List of towns in Central Province, Sri Lanka

External links

Populated places in Matale District